Frontier Doctor is an American Western television series starring Rex Allen that aired in syndication from September 26, 1958, until June 20, 1959. The series was also known as Unarmed and Man of the West. Outdoor action sequences for most episodes of Frontier Doctor were filmed on the Republic Pictures backlot in Studio City and on the Iverson Movie Ranch in Chatsworth, California, known for its huge sandstone boulders and widely recognized as the most heavily filmed outdoor shooting location in the history of Hollywood.

Synopsis
Frontier Doctor follows the exploits of a physician, Dr. Bill Baxter, who is based in Rising Springs in the Arizona Territory during the early 20th century. He rides in a buggy with his black bag and encounters more than his share of trouble as he aids many who cross his path. Baxter often finds difficulty with his patients, such as the outlaw Butch Cassidy. Stafford Repp occasionally appeared as Sheriff Brawley.

Selected episodes

In the 1958 episode "The Outlaw Legion", Dr. Baxter discovers that the men he is treating in a remote cabin are Butch Cassidy and members of the Hole in the Wall Gang. Joe Sawyer portrayed a boorish Cassidy. Doris Singleton, appeared as Laura, Cassidy's unhappy girlfriend who saves Dr. Baxter's life and tries to put her shady past behind her. Michael Ansara of Law of the Plainsman, appeared as Will Carver, a Cassidy henchman.

In "Queen of the Cimarron" (1958), Jean Willes portrays Fancy Varden, the owner of the Golden Slipper saloon, who starts her own cattle ranch with animals infected with anthrax. The disease soon spread from the cattle to the cowhands. Glenn Strange played the rancher Pat Cafferty. Also appearing in this episode are Robert Karnes as Marshal Dunham, Gregory Walcott as Red Redmond, and Harry Harvey, Jr., as Sam, one of the ill cowboys.

In "The Twisted Road" (1959), two young women are strangled to death shortly after a brother and sister, Stan and Hester Gray, played by Robert Vaughn and Virginia Christine, arrive in Rising Springs. Stan is soon suspected in the slayings, but there is a surprise ending. Chubby Johnson was cast as Sheriff Ed Wilson, with Malcolm Atterbury as the father of one of the victims, Mary Ross. Alan Dinehart, III was cast in this episode as Miller.

In "Gringo Pete" (1959), Don Oreck portrayed the lead as an outlaw who pledges to surrender his gang to law enforcement officers in exchange for parole. Instead "Gringo Pete" resumes his life of lawlessness and dares the authorities. Ted de Corsia appears in this episode as Charlie Breen.

John Ashley was cast in the 1959 episode, "Elkton Lake Feud", the story of a lingering dispute between two families over the ownership of the lake and the unwillingness of the losing side in court to accept the legal finding.

In the series finale, "Flaming Gold", Dr. Baxter while returning from a medical convention stops off in Richville to visit a former patient and friend, a lawyer. As it develops, the lawyer while arguing a case against an oil company, died under mysterious circumstances. Baxter suspects that the company is responsible for the lawyer's death so that the junior partner, Hamilton (Mark Dana), who lacks experience in such matters, will take over the case. Gloria Winters made her next-to-the-last career television appearance in this episode as a waitress in Richville.

Other guest stars

Jack Albertson as J. B. Drummond, Lee Van Cleef as Deputy Sid Carver, aka Bill Dalton, and  Tyler McVey as Sheriff Ed Wilson, in "The Great Stagecoach Robbery" (1958)
Chris Alcaide as Ed Slater in "Broken Barrier" (1959)
Diane Brewster as Marian Dell in "Law of the Badlands" (1959) 
Jean Carson as Flo Warren in "The Big Frame Up" (1959)
Mary Castle, formerly of Stories of the Century, appeared, along with Carleton G. Young, in "The Big Gamblers" and "The Confidence Gang" (both 1959).
Mason Alan Dinehart as Lonnie Davis in "The Homesteaders" and as Miller in "The Twisted Road" (both 1959)
Ann Doran as Ma 'Dallas' Bell in "Drifting Sands" (1959) 
Francis De Sales as Tom Lynch in "Double Boomerang" (1958)
Leo Gordon as Zip Wyatt in "Three Wanted Men" (1958)
Ron Hagerthy, another cast member of Sky King, portrays Pa Helbrog, with Alan Dinehart, III, as Lonny Davis, in "The Homesteaders" (1959).
Stacy Harris as Ed Miller in "Mystery of the Black Stallion" (1958)
Don C. Harvey as Sam Peterson, Gregg Palmer as Charlie Pierce, and Jackie Loughery, formerly of Judge Roy Bean, as Savannah Merrick, in "Crooked Circle" (1958)
John Hoyt as the rancher Clete Barron in "Trouble in Paradise Valley" (1958) 
Michael Landon as Jim Mason, with Frank Gorshin as Hank Butts, in "Shadow of Belle Starr" (1959)
Eve Miller as Paula Mason in "Shadow of Belle Starr" (1959)
Dennis Moore as Walker in "Three Wanted Men" (1958)
Slim Pickens in "Bittercreek Gang" (1959)
Rhodes Reason as Black Jack in "The Homesteaders" (1959)
Gloria Saunders in "Iron Trail Ambush" (1958)
Joe Turkel as Sear Middleton in "The Big Gamblers" (1959) 
Pierre Watkin as Dr. Breen of Samaritan Hospital and Lane Bradford as Gino in "San Francisco Story" (1958)
Frank Wilcox as Colonel Dodge in "Man to Man" (1959)
Morgan Woodward appeared in "Strange Cargo" (1959).

References

External links
 
 Frontier Doctor (The German TV-Title is: "Dr. Bill Baxter, Arzt in Arizona")
 Iverson Movie Ranch: History, vintage photos.
Rex Allen in action at the Iverson Movie Ranch in Frontier Doctor

1950s Western (genre) television series
1958 American television series debuts
1959 American television series endings
1950s American medical television series
Television series set in the 20th century
First-run syndicated television programs in the United States
Television series by CBS Studios
Black-and-white American television shows
Television shows set in Arizona
Television shows filmed in California
Works about physicians
Cultural depictions of Butch Cassidy and the Sundance Kid